Shooting at the 2016 Summer Paralympics consisted of twelve events, eight for rifle and 4 for pistol, across a range of men's, women's and mixed events.

Paralympic shooters were also classified according to the extent of their disability. The classification system allows shooters to compete against others with a similar level of function.

Shooting classifications are:
SH1 - competitors who do not need a shooting stand
SH2 - competitors who use a shooting stand to support the firearm's weight

Qualification

There were 140 athletes (100 male, 40 female) taking part in this sport. Any athlete awarded a qualification slot in one event is permitted to enter other eligible event if they have a minimum qualification score. Therefore, fields in each event are likely to be significantly larger than the qualification quotas below.

Qualification slots will be allocated as follows:

° : Bipartite invitation of named athlete.

Medal summary

Medal table

This ranking sorts countries by the number of gold medals earned by their shooters (in this context a nation is an entity represented by a National Paralympic Committee). The number of silver medals is taken into consideration next and then the number of bronze medals. If, after the above, countries are still tied, equal ranking is given and they are listed alphabetically.

Medalists 
Men

Women

Mixed

References

External links
Official Site of the 2016 Summer Paralympics 

 
2016
2016 Summer Paralympics events

Paralympics
Shooting competitions in Brazil